Retta is an unincorporated community in Jackson Township, Pope County, Arkansas, United States. It is a populated place located within the Township of Jackson, a minor civil division (MCD) of Pope County. The elevation of Retta is 679 feet. Retta appears on the Solo U.S. Geological Survey Map. Pope County is in the Central Time Zone (UTC -6 hours). The local timezone is named " America/Chicago''.

References

Unincorporated communities in Pope County, Arkansas
Unincorporated communities in Arkansas